Falsilatirus is a genus of sea snails, marine gastropod mollusks in the family Prodotiidae

Species
Species within the genus Falsilatirus include:
 Falsilatirus pacificus Emerson & Moffitt, 1988
 Falsilatirus suduirauti Bozzetti, 1995

References

 Fraussen K. & Stahlschmidt P. (2016). Revision of the Clivipollia group (Gastropoda: Buccinidae: Pisaniinae) with description of two new genera and three new species. Novapex. 17(2-3): 29-46

Prodotiidae